Bosque is a free and open-source programming language designed & developed by Microsoft that was inspired by the syntax and types of TypeScript and the semantics of ML and Node/JavaScript. Design goals for the language include better software quality and improved developer productivity.

Overview
Bosque was designed by Microsoft Research computer scientist Mark Marron, who describes the language as an effort to move beyond the structured programming model that became popular in the 1970s.

The structured programming paradigm, in which flow control is managed with loops, conditionals, and subroutines, became popular after a 1968 paper titled "Go To Statement Considered Harmful" by computer scientist Edsger Dijkstra. Marron believes we can do better by getting rid of sources of complexity like loops, mutable state, and reference equality. The result is Bosque, which represents a programming paradigm that Marron, in a paper he wrote, calls "regularized programming."

The Bosque specification, parser, type checker, reference interpreter, and IDE support are licensed under MIT License and available on GitHub.

Examples

Add two numbers

function add2(x: Int, y: Int): Int {
    return x + y;
}

add2(2, 3)     // 5
add2(x=2, y=3) // 5
add2(y=2, 5)   // 7

See also

Dafny
F* (programming language)
Free software movement

References

Further reading

External links
Bosque Programming Language - Microsoft Research
GitHub - microsoft/BosqueLanguage: The Bosque programming language is an experiment in regularized design for a machine assisted rapid and reliable software development lifecycle.

Microsoft free software
Microsoft programming languages
Microsoft Research
Programming languages created in 2019
Software using the MIT license
2019 software